Zamane Se Kya Darna  is a 1994 Bollywood film directed by actress Anita Raj's brother Bobby Raj, starring Sanjay Dutt, Raveena Tandon, Alok Nath, Shakti Kapoor, Gulshan Grover, Johny Lever and Raza Murad.

Cast

Sanjay Dutt as	Vikram Singh "Vicky" 
Raveena Tandon	as Anju 
Aloknath as Veerendra Singh / Sardar Rajpal
Reema Lagoo as	Shalini Singh "Shalu"
Gulshan Grover	as Bhairav
Shakti Kapoor as Shakti Singh
Raza Murad as Gajendra Singh
Johnny Lever as Pickpocket
Dinesh Hingoo as Chelaramani
Roma Manek	as Gauri
Guddi Maruti as Guddi
Shiva Rindani as Gypsy
Ghanshyam Rohera as Dhania
Ram Sethi as Pyarelal
Sudhir	as Gambler

Music

References

External links
 
 Zamane Se Kya Darna at AllMovie

1994 films
Films scored by Anand–Milind
1990s Hindi-language films